This is a list of conventional orbital launch systems. This is composed of launch vehicles, and other conventional systems, used to place satellites into orbit.

Argentina
ORBIT II – Retired
TRONADOR – Under Development

Australia
AUSROCK IV – Retired
Eris (Gilmour Space Technologies) – Under Development

Brazil
VLS-1 – Retired
VLM – Under Development

China 

Ceres-1
Feng Bao 1 – Retired
Hyperbola-1
Jielong
Jielong 1
Jielong 3
Kaituozhe-1 – Retired
Kuaizhou
Long March
Long March 1 – Retired
Long March 1D
Long March 2
Long March 2A – Retired
Long March 2C
Long March 2D
Long March 2E – Retired
Long March 2F
Long March 3 – Retired
Long March 3A
Long March 3B – Retired
Long March 3B/E
Long March 3C
Long March 4
Long March 4A – Retired
Long March 4B
Long March 4C
Long March 5
Long March 5B
Long March 6
Long March 6A
Long March 7
Long March 7A
Long March 8
921 rocket – Under Development
Long March 9 – Under Development
Long March 11
Zhuque-1
ZK-1A

European Union

Ariane
Ariane 1 – Retired
Ariane 2 – Retired
Ariane 3 – Retired
Ariane 4 – Retired
Ariane 5 – Operational
Ariane 6 – Under Development
Ariane Next – Under Development
Europa – Retired
Europa I – Retired
Europa II – Retired
Vega
Vega – Operational
Vega-C – Operational

France
Diamant – Retired
Diamant A – Retired 1965-1967
Diamant B – Retired 1970-1971
Diamant BP4 – Retired 1972-1975
 Zéphyr (Latitude) – Under Development

Germany
OTRAG – Retired
Spectrum (Isar Aerospace) – Under Development
RFA One (Rocket Factory Augsburg AG) – Under Development 
SL1 (HyImpulse) – Under Development

India

ISRO/DoS systems

SLV-3 – Retired
Augmented Satellite Launch Vehicle (ASLV) – Retired
Polar Satellite Launch Vehicle (PSLV)
PSLV-G – Retired
PSLV-CA – Operational
PSLV-XL – Operational
PSLV-DL – Operational
PSLV-QL – Operational
Geosychronous Satellite Launch Vehicle (GSLV)
GSLV Mark I – Retired
GSLV Mark II – Operational
GEV: GSLV derived ascent vehicle for RLV ORE campaign.
Geosynchronous Satellite Launch Vehicle Mark III (LVM-3)
LVM 3 – Operational
Human-rated LVM 3 – Under development
LVM 3 with semi-cryogenic engine – Under development
Small Satellite Launch Vehicle (SSLV) – Operational 
Nano Satellite Launch Vehicle (NSLV) – Under development
Unified Modular Launch Vehicle (ULV) – Concept
Next Generation Launch Vehicle (NGLV)– Propsed/Concept

Private agencies
Vikram rocket family (Skyroot Aerospace):
Vikram I – Under Development
Vikram II – Proposed
Vikram III – Proposed
 Chetak (Bellatrix Aerospace) – Under Development 
 Garuda (Bellatrix Aerospace) – Proposed 
 Agnibaan (AgniKul Cosmos) – Under Development 
 Phoenix (STAR Lab Surat) – Proposed
 Kalam (STAR Lab Surat) – Under development 
 RATAN-RLS (ORBITX India) – Proposed 
 ATAL-II-RLS (ORBITX India) – Proposed 
 SLV-1T (Urvyam Aerospace) – Proposed 
 SLV-VT (Urvyam Aerospace) – Proposed 
 Razor Crest Mk-1 (EtherealX) – Proposed

Indonesia
RPS-420 (Pengorbitan-1) – Under Development
RPS-550 (Pengorbitan-2) – Under Development

Iran

Safir – Retired
Simorgh – Under Development
Qased
Qaem 100 – Under Development
Zuljanah – Under Development

Iraq
Al Abid – Abandoned in R&D phase

Israel
Shavit 2

Italy
SISPRE C-41 – Retired
Italian LTV SCOUT (jointly with United States of America) – Retired
AERITALIA/SNIA/BPD ALFA – Retired
ALENIA/SNIA-BPD SAN MARCO SCOUT (jointly with NASA) – Cancelled
Vega (jointly with European Space Agency)
Vega – Retired
Vega-C – Operational
T4i Odyssey – Under Development
Italian Rockets

Japan

Lambda – Retired
L-4S
Mu – Retired

M-V
N – Retired
N-I
N-II
H-I – Retired
H-II
H-II – Retired
H-IIA
H-IIB – Retired
H3 – Under Development
J-I – Retired
GX – Cancelled
Epsilon
 SS-520
ZERO – Under Development

Malaysia
DNLV (Independence-X Aerospace) – Under Development

New Zealand
Electron (Rocket Lab, developed in New Zealand and the United States)
Neutron – Under Development

North Korea
Paektusan-1 – Retired
Unha
Unha-2 – Retired
Unha-3

Taiwan
TSLV – Under Development
Hapith V – Under Development
HTTP-3a – Under Development

Philippines
Haribon SLS-1 (OrbitX) – Under Development

Romania
Haas – Under Development

Soviet Union and successor states
Russia/USSR

Angara
CORONA (SSTO) – Open
Kosmos – Retired
Kosmos-1
Kosmos-2I
Kosmos-3
Kosmos-3M
Lin Industrial projects
Adler – Under Development
Aldan – Under Development
Aniva – Under Development
Taymyr – Under Development
Vyuga – Under Development
N1 – Retired
R-7
Luna – Retired
Molniya – Retired
Molniya-M
Molniya-L
Polyot – Retired
Soyuz family
Soyuz – Retired
Soyuz-L
Soyuz-M
Soyuz-U – Retired
Soyuz-U2
Soyuz-FG
Soyuz-2
Soyuz 2.1A
Soyuz 2.1B
Soyuz 2.1V
Sputnik – Retired
Stalker (rocket)
Voskhod – Retired 
Vostok – Retired
Vostok-L
Vostok-K
Vostok-2
Vostok-2M
Soyuz/Vostok
R-29
Shtil'
Volna
Rus-M – Canceled
Start-1
Universal Rocket
UR-100
Rokot
Strela
Proton (UR-500) – Retired
Proton-K
Proton-M
Energia – Retired

 Ukraine
 Zenit
 Zenit 2 – Retired
 Zenit-2M – Retired
 Zenit-3SL
 Zenit 3SLB
 Zenit-3F
R-36
Dnepr
Tsyklon
Tsyklon-2 – Retired
Tsyklon-3 – Retired
Tsyklon-4 – Abandoned
Cyclone-4M – Under Development

South Africa
RSA – Cancelled
RSA-1
RSA-2
RSA-3
CHEETAH-1 – Under Development

South Korea
Blue Whale 1 (Perigee Aerospace) – Under Development
Icarus family (Innospace) – Under Development
Icarus-N
Icarus-M
Icarus-S
Naro family
KSLV-1 (Naro) – Retired
KSLV-2 (Nuri)

Spain
INTA Family
 INTA Capricornio – Cancelled
 INTA Programa PILUM – Under Development
PLD Space Family
 PLD Space Miura 5 – Under development
 PLD Space Miura 1 – Under development
Pangea Aerospace Family
 Pangea Aerospace Meso – Under development
Zero 2 Infinity Family
 Zero 2 Infinity Bloostar – Under development'
 Celestia Aerospace Family
 Celestia Aerospace Sagittarius – Under developmentTurkey
UFS – Under Development since 2007United Kingdom
Black Arrow – RetiredBlack Prince – CancelledPrime (Orbex) – Under DevelopmentSkyrora XL (Skyrora) – Under DevelopmentSkylon (Reaction Engines) – Under DevelopmentUnited States

Active

Alpha (Firefly Aerospace)
Antares (Northrop Grumman Innovation Systems)
Atlas V (United Launch Alliance)
Electron (Rocket Lab) (New Zealand/United States company) 
LauncherOne (Virgin Orbit)
Minotaur (Northrop Grumman Innovation Systems)
Minotaur I
Minotaur IV
Minotaur V
Minotaur-C
Pegasus (Northrop Grumman Innovation Systems)
Space Launch System (NASA)
SpaceX launch vehicles
Falcon 9 Block 5 – OperationalFalcon Heavy – OperationalInactive

Ares – CanceledAres I
Ares IV
Ares V
Athena – RetiredAthena I
Athena II
Atlas
Atlas B – RetiredAtlas D – RetiredAtlas-Able – RetiredAtlas-Agena – RetiredAtlas E/F – RetiredAtlas H – RetiredAtlas LV-3B – RetiredAtlas SLV-3 – RetiredAtlas-Centaur – RetiredAtlas G – RetiredAtlas I – RetiredAtlas II – RetiredAtlas III – RetiredConestoga – RetiredElectron (Rocket Lab) (New Zealand/United States company) 
LauncherOne 
Minotaur
Minotaur I
Minotaur IV
Minotaur V
Minotaur-C
New Glenn (Blue Origin) – Under Development OmegA – Canceled Orbital Accelerator (SpinLaunch) – Under DevelopmentPhantom Express – CanceledPilot – RetiredRedstone – RetiredJuno I
Sparta
Jupiter
Juno II
Rocket 3 (Astra Space) – RetiredSaturn
Saturn I – Retired 1961-1963 
Saturn IB – Retired 1966-1975Saturn V – Retired 1967-1973Scout – RetiredScout X-1
Scout X-2
Scout X-2B
Scout X-2M
Scout X-3
Scout X-3M
Scout X-4
Scout A
Scout A-1
Scout B
Scout B-1
Scout D-1
Scout E-1
Scout F-1
Scout G-1
Space Shuttle – RetiredSpaceX launch vehicles
Falcon 1 – RetiredFalcon 1e – CanceledFalcon 5 – CanceledFalcon 9
Falcon 9 Air – CanceledFalcon 9 v1.0 – RetiredFalcon 9 v1.1 – RetiredFalcon 9 Full Thrust – RetiredStarship – Under DevelopmentSuper Heavy (booster) – Under DevelopmentTerran 1 (Relativity Space) – Under Development Terran R (Relativity Space) – Under DevelopmentThor – RetiredThor-Able  – RetiredThor-Ablestar – RetiredThor-Agena – RetiredThorad-Agena – RetiredThor-Burner – RetiredThor DSV-2U – RetiredDelta
Thor-Delta – RetiredDelta A – RetiredDelta B – RetiredDelta C – RetiredDelta D – RetiredDelta E – RetiredDelta G – RetiredDelta J – RetiredDelta L – RetiredDelta M – RetiredDelta N – RetiredDelta II – RetiredDelta III – RetiredDelta IV – RetiredDelta IV Heavy – OperationalTitan – RetiredTitan II GLV
Titan 23G
Titan IIIA
Titan IIIB
Titan IIIC
Titan IIID
Titan IIIE
Titan 34D
Commercial Titan III
Titan IV
Vanguard – RetiredVector-R – Under DevelopmentVector-H – Under DevelopmentVulcan – Under Development''

See also
 Comparison of orbital launch systems
 Comparison of orbital launcher families
Lists of orbital launch vehicles by payload capacity:
Small-lift launch vehicle (up to 2,000kg to Low Earth Orbit (LEO)
Medium-lift launch vehicle (from 2,000 to 20,000kg to LEO)
Heavy-lift launch vehicle (from 20,000 to 50,000kg to LEO)
Super heavy-lift launch vehicle (beyond 50,000kg to LEO)

References

+
orbital launch systems